The RBS 56 BILL is a Swedish manportable SACLOS wire-guided anti-tank missile developed by AB Bofors. Development began in 1979 and entered production in 1985. The Swedish Army began receiving the missile in March 1988. BILL stands for (Bofors, Infantry, Light and Lethal). By 1996, 15,000 missiles had been produced and supplied to the Swedish and Austrian armies. Between 1996 and 1997 Brazil received a number of missiles. In the late 1990s production shifted to the RBS 56B BILL 2. The Swedish army received the first deliveries of the BILL 2 in 1999.

Description

A man portable BILL system consists of a missile in a sealed launch tube, tripod, day sight and thermal night-vision sight. The missile's shaped charge warhead is aimed downwards at an angle of 30 degrees and is triggered by a proximity fuze as the missile passes over the intended target.

The top attack warhead allows the missile to strike the thinner top armour of tanks. To enable this to work effectively the missile flies 0.75 meters above the line of sight between the launcher and the target. A secondary effect of this is to enable the missile to be used to engage targets largely behind cover, for example a hull down tank.

When launched the missile is propelled from the launch tube at around 72 meters per second by a gas generator at the rear of the launch tube. Once the missile is clear of the launch tube the sustainer motor engages and accelerates the missile to a speed of 250 meters per second. Once the missile is about 400 meters from the launcher, the sustainer motor cuts out and the missile continues in free flight.

Operators

Current operators
: Marines

Former operators
: through 2010
 through 2006

: Swedish army, 1985–2013

References

 

Anti-tank guided missiles of Sweden